Highlands Ranch shooting may refer to:
 2017 Copper Canyon Apartment Homes shooting, a mass shooting that took place in a apartment housing which left one dead and 6 others injured
 2019 STEM School Highlands Ranch shooting, a mass shooting that took place in a charter school which left one dead and 8 others injured

See also 
 List of mass shootings in the United States